Municipio Roma IX is the ninth administrative subdivision of Rome (Italy).

It was established by the Capitoline Assembly with Resolution no. 11 of 11 March 2013 and replaces Municipio Roma XII (former "Circoscrizione XII").

Geography 
It is located in the southern area of the city and includes the Decima-Malafede and the Laurentino-Acqua Acetosa nature reserves.

Historical subdivisions 
In the territory of the municipio there are the following districts of Rome:
Quarters
 Q. X Ostiense (partially), Q. XXXI Giuliano-Dalmata and Q. XXXII Europa.

Zones
 Z. XXII Cecchignola (partially), Z. XXIII Castel di Leva (partially), Z. XXIV Fonte Ostiense, Z. XXV Vallerano, Z. XXVI Castel di Decima, Z. XXVII Torrino, Z. XXVIII Tor de' Cenci, Z. XXIX Castel Porziano (partially), Z. XXXI Mezzocammino and Z. XXXIX Tor di Valle.

Administrative subdivisions 
The urban subdivision of the territory includes the thirteen urban zones of the former Municipio Roma XII; the population is distributed as follows:

Frazioni 

The following frazioni of Rome are included in the area of the Municipio:
 Castello della Cecchignola, Fonte Laurentina, Mostacciano, Tor de' Cenci, Spinaceto and Vitinia.

Culture

Cinemas 
 Eurcine, in Via Liszt.
 Stardust Village, in Via di Decima.

Notes

External links 
 

Municipi of Rome